The 2022 Northern Ireland Assembly election was held on 5 May 2022. It elected 90 members to the Northern Ireland Assembly. It was the seventh assembly election since the establishment of the assembly in 1998. The election was held three months after the Northern Ireland Executive collapsed due to the resignation of the First Minister, Paul Givan (DUP), in protest against the Northern Ireland Protocol.

In the sixth assembly, elected in 2017, eight parties had Members of the Legislative Assembly (MLAs): the Democratic Unionist Party (DUP), latterly led by Jeffrey Donaldson; Sinn Féin, led by Michelle O'Neill; the Ulster Unionist Party (UUP), latterly led by Doug Beattie; the Social Democratic and Labour Party (SDLP), led by Colum Eastwood; Alliance, led by Naomi Long; the Greens, led by Clare Bailey; People Before Profit (PBP), who have a collective leadership; and the Traditional Unionist Voice (TUV), led by Jim Allister.

Sinn Féin became the largest party, marking the first time an Irish nationalist/republican party won the most seats in an assembly election in Northern Ireland, and has the right to nominate Northern Ireland's first nationalist First Minister. The DUP's vote share dropped almost 7% and it lost three seats; despite this, unionists won two more seats than nationalists—37 seats to 35—and a marginally higher share of the vote. Alliance also made large gains, overtaking the UUP and the SDLP to become the third-largest party in the Assembly.  The Greens lost both seats they held before the election and were unrepresented in the Assembly for the first time since 2003.

As Northern Ireland's government is based on power-sharing, the DUP (as the largest unionist party) must nominate a deputy First Minister for the Executive to be formed; however, they said they will not do so until their issues with the Northern Ireland Protocol are dealt with.

Background

Electoral events
In May 2013, Theresa Villiers, Secretary of State for Northern Ireland, announced that the next Assembly election would be postponed to May 2016, and would be held at fixed intervals of five years thereafter. Section 7 of the Northern Ireland (Miscellaneous Provisions) Act 2014 specifies that elections will be held on the first Thursday in May on the fifth calendar year following that in which its predecessor was elected, which would be 5 May 2022; however, there are several circumstances in which the Assembly can be dissolved before the date scheduled by virtue of section 31(1) of the Northern Ireland Act 1998.

In June 2016, the UK voted to leave the European Union, although Northern Ireland voted to remain. The process of withdrawal held particular uncertainty for Northern Ireland due to the potential for customs on the UK–Ireland border. Meanwhile, an early election was held to the Northern Ireland Assembly in March 2017. After the election, Sinn Féin stated that it would not return to a power-sharing arrangement with the Democratic Unionist Party without significant changes in the party's approach, including Arlene Foster not becoming First Minister until an investigation into the Renewable Heat Incentive scandal was complete. Over the next few years, the deadline to form an executive was repeatedly extended as negotiations continued with no success.

On 18 April 2017, Theresa May, Prime Minister of the UK, called for a general election to be held on 8 June 2017. The Conservative Party lost its parliamentary majority and sought a confidence and supply agreement with the DUP to remain in government. The DUP and the Conservatives reached an agreement on 26 June.

In 2019, the UK experienced significant political turbulence over the question of how to proceed with Brexit. The European Parliament election in May 2019 saw the Alliance Party take the third MEP place from the Ulster Unionist Party (UUP). DUP support for the Conservative government broke down with disagreements over the government's Brexit plans. The Conservative government sought a new election, held in December 2019, which they won with a large majority. In Northern Ireland, for the first time, traditional Irish nationalist parties won more seats than traditional unionist parties. The SDLP and Alliance returned to the House of Commons, while the DUP and Sinn Féin saw vote share declines of more than 5%.

A DUP/Sinn Féin executive was re-established on 10 January 2020 with the New Decade, New Approach (NDNA) agreement, forestalling an immediate new election. By the end of February 2020, the COVID-19 pandemic was confirmed to have spread to Northern Ireland.

On 15 January 2022, the UK government was accused of interfering in the election by reintroducing dual mandates, which had been abolished in 2016. This would enable MPs like Donaldson to have seats in Stormont as well as Westminster, but plans were withdrawn four days later.

Leadership changes
On 28 April 2021, Arlene Foster announced that she would be resigning as DUP leader on 28 May and First Minister in June 2021 after more than 20 DUP MLAs and four DUP MPs signed a letter "...voicing no confidence in her leadership". Edwin Poots narrowly won the subsequent May 2021 DUP leadership election, but announced his resignation 21 days later. The runner-up in the election, Jeffrey Donaldson, stood unopposed in the June 2021 DUP leadership election and with no other candidates the party chose not to hold a ballot (some parties still do a leadership vote or ballot with one candidate with the other option to re-open nominations). Donaldson was ratified as the party's leader on 30 June 2021. Meanwhile, after Poots elected not to replace Foster as First Minister, Paul Givan took up the position on 17 June 2021.

Steve Aiken announced his resignation as leader of the UUP on 8 May 2021, with Doug Beattie taking up the post nine days later after standing unopposed.

Northern Ireland Protocol
The Northern Ireland Protocol is a protocol to the Brexit Withdrawal Agreement that governs the unique customs and immigration issues at the border in the island of Ireland between the United Kingdom and the European Union, and on some aspects of trade in goods between Northern Ireland and the rest of the United Kingdom. Its terms were negotiated in 2019 and agreed and concluded in December 2020. Due to a thirty-year internecine conflict in Northern Ireland known as The Troubles, the UK–Ireland border has had a special status since that conflict was ended by the Belfast Agreement/Good Friday Agreement of 1998. As part of the Northern Ireland Peace Process, the border has been largely invisible, without any physical barrier or customs checks on its many crossing points; this arrangement was made possible by both countries' common membership of both the European Single Market and EU Customs Union, and of their Common Travel Area.

The DUP threatened to pull out of Stormont's power-sharing government on 9 September 2021, triggering a snap election "within weeks" unless the protocol was scrapped. Donaldson warned: "I say not as a threat but as a matter of political reality that our political institutions will not survive a failure to resolve the problems the Protocol has created." The following week, SDLP leader Colum Eastwood accused the DUP of having a "petulant strop" and called for a new law to stop an early election. He told peers that the "delicate constitutional balance" in Northern Ireland was "too fragile for people to play games with".

On 3 February 2022, Givan resigned as First Minister in protest over the protocol, which automatically resulted in the Deputy First Minister losing her role and the Northern Ireland Executive collapsing. Conservative MP Jacob Rees-Mogg said that the UK government would "reform" the protocol if the EU did not, whilst it was also reported that Westminster was planning legislation that would give ministers powers to abolish the protocol altogether. During a rally in Ballymena on 30 April, TUV leader Jim Allister said that the Executive would not be returning unless the protocol was removed.

Calls for early election
Following the collapse of the Assembly, Sinn Féin and the DUP both called for the election to be brought forward, but the UUP, SDLP and Alliance Party opposed the idea. Northern Ireland Secretary Brandon Lewis ruled out an early election, saying that the priority was to get the Assembly up and running again. Two weeks later, however, Lewis claimed there was "a real risk" that the Executive would not return after the election.

Possible results
Prior to the election, parties, commentators and the media had noted the possibility of a nationalist party, Sinn Féin, topping the poll for the first time. In such a case, under the St Andrews Agreement of 2006, Sinn Féin would have the right to nominate the First Minister regardless of whether the Unionist bloc was larger or not. The high polling of the non-sectarian Alliance Party also presented a challenge to the consociational nature of the Assembly; were they to become the second largest party in the Assembly, it would be unlikely that they would have the right to nominate a deputy First Minister, as the right of nomination is reserved to the largest party of the largest designation which did not nominate the First Minister.

Candidates 
Nominations opened on 29 March 2022 for the assembly election and closed on 8 April 2022.

A total of 239 candidates contested the 90 available seats in the Assembly, an increase from 228 in 2016. Eighty-seven women ran as candidates in the election, which is the highest number in history. The seats were spread over 18 constituencies, with each constituency having five seats. The election was conducted using the single transferable vote system.

The table below lists all of the nominated candidates.

Members not seeking re-election
The following MLAs announced that they would not stand for re-election.

Campaign 
The Sinn Féin campaign avoided talk of a united Ireland, instead focusing on "bread and butter" issues. Sinn Féin called for a £230 payment to help people with the cost of living. A threat to destroy a Sinn Féin billboard was reported to the police. The Social Democratic and Labour Party's campaign had reportedly been difficult. Candidate Elsie Trainor was attacked by youths in Belfast who also hurled sectarian abuse. Leader Colum Eastwood urged tactical voting. Aontú was the only Irish nationalist party to campaign on an anti-abortion platform.

The Democratic Unionist Party campaign focused on their opposition to the Northern Ireland Protocol, Sinn Féin and the prospect of a referendum on Irish unity. The Traditional Unionist Voice said that opposing the Northern Ireland Protocol is "top priority". They received a number of defections from the DUP. In contrast to the DUP, the Ulster Unionist Party leader Doug Beattie said a united Ireland would not happen in his or his children's lifetime, thus "we can set it aside in order to concentrate on the issues affecting the daily lives of our people who live here". All three unionist leaders attended a series of rallies against the Protocol. In March, Beattie announced he would continue to oppose the Protocol but would no longer take part in the rallies. Beattie said they had been hijacked by loyalists to raise tensions "that now see a resurgence in UVF activity". Following this, his constituency office in Portadown was attacked, and an election poster with a noose around his neck appeared at a loyalist rally in Lurgan.

The Alliance Party advocated reform of the Stormont institutions to remove the designation system and avoid a "cycle of collapse". It also advocated health reform and the introduction of a child payment scheme to support people with the cost of living. The party further promised to build Casement Park, positioned itself as the "centre ground" and campaigned in constituencies west of the River Bann, where they have never won any seats.

The Green Party pledged the establishment of a bill of rights, an independent Environmental Protection Agency, and rent controls.   The People Before Profit manifesto was launched on 22 April. In it, they promised a £1,000 to help with cost of living. On 30 April, PBP candidate Hannah Kenny was attacked by three men in East Belfast, who also subjected her to "sectarian and misogynistic" abuse.

On 13 April, it was reported that the Police Service of Northern Ireland had been notified of 41 political poster incidents.

Televised debates between the party leaders were held on 1 May and 3 May.

Opinion polls 

* (U): Unionist, (N): Nationalist, (O): Other

Results 
Votes were counted on 6 and 7 May. Sinn Féin became the largest party, marking the first time an Irish nationalist/republican party had won the most seats in an election in Northern Ireland, and has the right to nominate Northern Ireland's first nationalist First Minister. As Northern Ireland's government is based on power-sharing, the DUP (as second-largest party) must nominate a deputy First Minister for the Executive to be formed; however, they said they will not do so until their issues with the Northern Ireland Protocol are dealt with.

The DUP's vote share dropped almost 7% and lost three seats; despite this, unionists won two more seats than nationalists—37 seats to 35—and a marginally higher share of the vote. This being said, socialist party People Before Profit—who returned one candidate to the Assembly—favour a united socialist Ireland, though they officially designated themselves as Socialist, rather than Nationalist or Unionist, on the electoral register. Indeed, both nationalist parties (4) and unionist parties (3) lost seats overall to 'Others', who gained 7 seats for their highest ever proportion of seats in the assembly, 18 seats, or 20% of those available, despite both Green candidates losing their seat.  Unionist parties lost greater combined vote share, losing just over 2.5% of the total vote, whereas nationalist parties (including newcomers Aontú) lost only around 0.5% of vote share combined.

Alliance achieved their highest ever first-preference vote share in an Assembly election, becoming the third-largest party in the Assembly and adding over 50% to their vote share, going from 9% to over 13.5%. They overtook the UUP (who lost one seat) and the SDLP (who lost four), who both received their lowest ever vote shares. The TUV also achieved their highest vote share, tripling their share and up 5% from the last election, but they did not win any more seats. The Greens lost both seats they held before the election and were shut out of the Assembly for the first time since 2003. Alex Easton, who left the DUP in 2021, was re-elected as an independent unionist, as was the returning former Justice Minister, Claire Sugden. Colum Eastwood believed SDLP voters gave their support to Sinn Féin in this election, saying "there's a tide there and people wanted to send a message, they wanted to kick the DUP and I think this is how they decided to do it".

Distribution of seats by constituency 
Party affiliation of the five Assembly members returned by each constituency. The first column indicates the party of the Member of the House of Commons (MP) returned by the corresponding parliamentary constituency in the 2019 United Kingdom general election under the first-past-the-post voting method.

Share of first-preference votes

Percentage of each constituency's first-preference votes. Absolute majorities are in bold. The constituencies are arranged in the geographic order described for the table above; click the icon next to "Constituency" to see them in alphabetical order.

The totals given here are the sum of all valid ballots cast in each constituency, and the percentages are based on such totals. The turnout percentages in the last column, however, are based upon all ballots cast, which also include anything from twenty to a thousand invalid ballots in each constituency. The total valid ballots' percentage of the eligible electorate can correspondingly differ by 0.1% to 2% from the turnout percentage.

All constituencies were five-seat constituencies, with members elected under the Single transferable vote system. The quota in each constituency was therefore approximately 16.67% of the vote in the constituency. However, in some cases, despite a party gaining more than that share of the vote, imperfect transfer discipline between candidates meant that a seat was not automatically gained.

Incumbents defeated

Aftermath
Shortly before the final results were announced, O'Neill said: "Today ushers in a new era. Irrespective of religious, political or social backgrounds, my commitment is to make politics work." Donaldson stated that the Executive would not sit unless the Northern Ireland Protocol was removed. He later announced that he would not take his Assembly seat, which was co-opted by Emma Little-Pengelly, and the DUP would not be nominating a Speaker until the UK government took "decisive action".

The SDLP responded by accusing the DUP of treating voters with contempt and "mak[ing] our electoral process look like a bad joke". Naomi Long, leader of Alliance, said DUP Assembly Members should not be allowed to claim their salary while they prevented the Assembly from functioning. These disagreements continued a political crisis from before the election, prompting Prime Minister Boris Johnson to visit Northern Ireland to discuss amendments to the Protocol.

The Democratic Unionist Party (DUP) refused to resume power sharing due to its stance on the protocol. As of October 2022, it was reported that this would potentially lead to an early Northern Ireland Assembly election.

See also

Other elections in the UK which were held on the same day:
 2022 United Kingdom local elections
 2022 Scottish local elections
 2022 Welsh local elections

Footnotes

References

External links

2022 Northern Ireland Assembly election manifestos:

 Democratic Unionist Party (5- Point Plan)
 Sinn Féin (English)  (Irish/Gaeilge)
 Social Democratic and Labour Party
 Ulster Unionist Party
Alliance Party
 Green Party Northern Ireland
 People Before Profit 
 Traditional Unionist Voice

Elections to the Northern Ireland Assembly
Assembly election
Northern Ireland Assembly election